Ağa Hamamı is a historical Turkish bath located on Turnacıbaşı street in the Taksim Square neighborhood of Istanbul, Turkey. It was constructed by İbrahim Ağa in 1454.

History
The Ağa Hamamı was constructed for Fatih Sultan Mehmet as a private hamam for him and his sons. At that time, Beyoğlu District was not settled and the Padishahs would come there for hunting. The sultan constructed this building as a hunting house in 1454. Ağa Hamamı was designed as a hamam below the two flats above. It underwent a large-scale renovation in 1844 by Abdülmecid I . It was used by the Padishahs and their sons until the final years of the Ottoman Empire.

Architecture

External structure
It is a three-floor building sitting on a 650 sqm of land. The first two floors were built as the house and the entrance floor as the Ağa Hamamı. The exterior and the top of hammam (a skylight dome with round frames) were designed to receive the daylight from sunrise to sunset. 
The hammam has a 250 sqm section at the back to heat it. In those years this section was named “kulhan”.
This building was influenced by the classic era that began at the end of the 15th century. Many buildings that were constructed by Mehmed the Conqueror right after the Conquest of Constantinople followed this trend.

Internal structure
The internal structure consists of sections called “soyunmalik, iliklik and sicaklik” (changing rooms and the sections for warming up and heating up respectively)
Apart from these sections, the installations section takes up a huge room. This section consists of the water reservoir, kulhan and cehennemlik (literally “hell room”).
The most voluminous spaces in Ağa Hamamı are usually the changing rooms. 
The house and the hammam have very high ceilings which extend up to 3.5 meters. High ceilings are the most prominent features of historical buildings.

The internal part of Ağa Hamamı consists of three sections:

 Entrance (changing room)
There are three floors in the entrance section and the middle part of these three floors is open, which is an architectural example of that period. The changing rooms and the recreation chamber are in this section. This section has no heating system and hot water installations.

 Inside the hammam (iliklik and sicaklik)
The “iliklik” is the section that helps your body to adapt to the temperature changes between the changing room and the section called “sicaklik”. The most important space of hammams is the “sicaklik”. It was constructed as two parts. In the first part there are doorless cells called “halvet” located at the corners. In the second part there are bathing niches (located between the cells), marble banks running along the wall sides and in the middle a center stone. There are nine “kurnas” and a center stone in the large area. This is the part for sweating and bathing. Walls and floors are covered with marble. Halvets have three kurnas each.

 Kulhan
Kulhan section includes the water reservoir and the cehennemlik. Kulhan is the section from which the hammam is heated. It sits on an area of 250 square meters. It is both used for the storage of firewood and for the heating of hammam. It is located at the rearmost of the hammam. Here, the heat generated in a furnace is distributed below the hammam (in the cehennemlik). The furnace also heats the bathing water.

Features

During the 15th century, sultans or padishahs constructed hammams for the public use and therefore the hammams were used to be constructed as double (separate parts for men and women). 
The most important feature of the Ağa Hamamı is its being a public hammam. It was a hammam which the padishah of the time constructed for himself under a hunting house. Despite not being a definite example of a palace hammam it is an example of a private padishah hammam.

Renovation
The hammam underwent a large-scale renovation in 1844 by Abdulmecid, moving it further away from the classic era architecture that began in the 15th century. 
The last renovation of the hammam was in 1986 by Ali Yilmaz, the last owner. There have been no renovations for about thirty years.

References

Turkish culture
Ottoman baths
Ottoman architecture in Istanbul
Buildings and structures in Istanbul
Tourist attractions in Istanbul
Public baths in Turkey